Guillermo Tomasevich Castañeda (born March 20, 1987) is a Peruvian footballer who plays as a centre forward.

Club career
Tomasevich developed as a footballer in the youth academy of Deportivo Municipal. He was promoted to first team in January 2008 and played in the 2008 Peruvian Second Division season.

In January 2009 Tomasevich joined Cusco giants Cienciano for the start of the 2009 season. He made his Peruvian First Division debut that season on 11 April 2009 away to Alianza Lima. Already down two goals, manager Julio Cesar Uribe allowed Tomasevich to enter the match in the 75th minute, but eventually it finished in a 2–0 win  for Alianza Lima. In his seventh league match, Tomasevich scored his first goal in the Descentralizado on 9 August 2009 away to Alianza Atletico. Playing in the Campeones del 36 stadium, he entered the match for Jaime Linares in the 86th minute  and managed to score his debut goal in the 93rd minute of the match to salvage a 1–1 draw.

On January 5, 2011 Tomasevich joined Universitario de Deportes for the start of the 2011 season and signed a contract for two seasons.

On September 25, 2012 Tomasevich scored his first official goal with Universitario de Deportes against Universidad San Martín de Porres from a header.

References

External links

1987 births
Living people
Footballers from Lima
Association football forwards
Peruvian footballers
Peruvian people of Croatian descent
Deportivo Municipal footballers
Cienciano footballers
Ayacucho FC footballers
Club Universitario de Deportes footballers
Juan Aurich footballers
León de Huánuco footballers
Peruvian Segunda División players
Peruvian Primera División players